Canavieiras is a municipality in the state of Bahia in the North-East region of Brazil.

The municipality contains part of the  Canavieiras Extractive Reserve, created in 2006.

See also
List of municipalities in Bahia

References

External links

Populated coastal places in Bahia
Municipalities in Bahia